Pajtuński Młyn  is a settlement in the administrative district of Gmina Purda, within Olsztyn County, Warmian-Masurian Voivodeship, in northern Poland. It is located within the historic region of Warmia.

Until the interwar period it formed part of the nearby village of Pajtuny, founded in 1374. A historic water mill is located in Pajtuński Młyn.

Before 1772 the area was part of Kingdom of Poland, from 1772 Prussia and after 1871 Germany, and after 1945 again Poland.

References

Villages in Olsztyn County